Crossover Dreams is a 1985 film directed by Leon Ichaso. The film follows salsa singer Rudy Veloz (played by musician Rubén Blades) on his rise to fame as he tries to break into the mainstream music scene. The film mostly takes place in Spanish Harlem, New York City. This was the first major feature film role for Rubén Blades.

Roger Ebert praised Blades' performance: "The story isn't new, but it sure does wear well. Maybe that's because Blades is such an engaging performer, playing a character who is earnest and sincere when he needs to be, but who always maintains a veil over his deepest secrets."

References

External links
 

1985 films
1985 comedy-drama films
American comedy-drama films
Miramax films
1985 comedy films
1985 drama films
Films directed by Leon Ichaso
1980s English-language films
1980s American films